Mucking In is a New Zealand "reality" television programme that airs on Television One. It is hosted by Jim Mora. He is assisted by gardener Tony Murrell.

The show features a very similar premise to the show Ground Force, in which a team of gardener and local volunteers employed by the show descend on an individual's place and improve the garden for the cameras within a specified time limit. People whose gardens are made over are nominated by the public, often for the voluntary work they have done within the community.

See also
 Ground Force
 Backyard Blitz

References

Further reading
Jim Mora and Tony Murrell (2009). Mucking In. HarperCollins New Zealand. . (Press release.)

External links
 Official website
 

New Zealand reality television series
TVNZ 1 original programming
Gardening television